Evershed is a lunar impact crater on the far side of the Moon, named after the English solar astronomer John Evershed. It is located to the northeast of the larger crater Cockcroft, and to the north of the smaller Van den Bergh.

This crater has a worn outer rim that is somewhat indented and narrower along the eastern side where the formation overlays an older crater. The satellite crater Evershed R is attached to the outer southwest rim. There are small craters along the southern and southeast rim. The interior floor contains an irregular ridge near the midpoint and some rugged terrain in the south, with various tiny craterlets marking the remaining relatively level surface.

Satellite craters
By convention these features are identified on lunar maps by placing the letter on the side of the crater midpoint that is closest to Evershed.

References

 
 
 
 
 
 
 
 
 
 
 
 

Impact craters on the Moon